Stockholm Academic Male Chorus is a Swedish amateur choir, which was founded in 1905. Today, the choir is one of Sweden's top male choirs.

The choir has produced many recordings. The CD Välkommen till våren made Audiophile Audition's Best Of The Year Discs list for 2003.

References

External links
Official site

Swedish choirs
Musical groups established in 1905
1905 establishments in Sweden